Zarasai County was one of the counties of the Russian Empire.

History
Established 1795 under Vilna Governorate. Transferred to  Kovno Governorate in 1843. Formal abolition in 1924 by Soviet authorities.

Demographics
At the time of the Russian Empire Census of 1897, Zarasai County had a population of 208,487. Of these, 49.8% spoke Lithuanian, 16.8% Belarusian, 12.7% Yiddish, 9.9% Russian, 8.9% Polish, 1.8% Latvian and 0.1% German as their native language.

References

 
Uezds of Vilna Governorate
Uezds of Kovno Governorate
Kovno Governorate